Mark Adrianatos (born 31 January 1996) is a South African cricketer. He made his List A debut for Western Province in the 2018–19 CSA Provincial One-Day Challenge on 17 February 2019.

References

External links
 

1996 births
Living people
South African cricketers
Western Province cricketers
Place of birth missing (living people)